Marie Laure Gigon (born June 15, 1984) is a French sport shooter. She is also a member of ATP de Maiche for the shooting class, and is coached and trained by Maxime Lasalle.

Biography
Gigon represented France at the 2008 Summer Olympics in Beijing, where she competed for two rifle shooting events. She placed seventh out of forty-seven shooters in the women's 10 m air rifle, with a total score of 497.3 points (396 in the preliminary and 101.3 in the final). Nearly a week later, Gigon competed for her second event, 50 m rifle 3 positions, where she was able to shoot 184 targets in a standing position, and 192 each in prone and in kneeling, for a total score of 568 points, finishing only in thirty-eighth place.

References

External links
ISSF Profile
Profile – French Olympic Committee 
NBC 2008 Olympics profile

French female sport shooters
Living people
Olympic shooters of France
Shooters at the 2008 Summer Olympics
Sportspeople from Besançon
1984 births